The 3rd Motorized Infantry Brigade "Dacia"  is an motorized infantry unit of the Moldovan National Army's Ground Forces based in Cahul.

History
The Dacia Motorized Infantry Brigade in Cahul was created on February 24, 1992, by the decree of the President of the Republic of Moldova. The brigade was among the first units of the National Army to take the oath of faith to the Republic of Moldova and its citizens on March 4, 1992. The brigade is made up of former Soviet Army units in Cahul and Gagauzia's Comrat. It was among the first units to engage in the Transnistria War in 1992. In 2018, the unit was awarded the State Order "Faith of the Homeland" 1st class. It celebrated its 28th anniversary in 2020 with an oath taking ceremony and a military parade on Independence Square in Cahul in the presence of Defense Minister Victor Gaiciuc.

Like all the other motorized infantry brigades in the ground forces, the brigade maintains a military band which serves on special occasions.

References 

Military units and formations of Moldova
1992 establishments in Moldova